The following units and commanders fought at the Battle of Wauhatchie of the American Civil War on the Confederate side. The Union order of battle is listed separately. Order of battle compiled from the army organization during the battle, and the reports.

Abbreviations used

Military rank
 LTG = Lieutenant General
 BG = Brigadier General
 Col = Colonel
 Ltc = Lieutenant Colonel
 Maj = Major
 Cpt = Captain

Other
 (w) = wounded
 (mw) = mortally wounded
 (k) = killed in action

Army of Tennessee

Longstreet's Corps

LTG James Longstreet

Notes

References
 U.S. War Department, The War of the Rebellion: a Compilation of the Official Records of the Union and Confederate Armies, U.S. Government Printing Office, 1880–1901.

American Civil War orders of battle